Charles F. Orthwein (January 28, 1839 - December 28, 1898) was a German-born American businessman from St. Louis, Missouri.

Early life
Charles F. Orthwein was born on January 28, 1839, to Frederick Charles Orthwein and Louise Lidle. He emigrated to the United States in 1860, where he was soon joined by his brother, William D. Orthwein.

Career
Orthwein was a grain merchant and "steel car magnate."  In the 1860s, Orthwein co-founded Haenshen & Orthwein, a grain exchange firm in St. Louis. In 1870, Orthwein co-founded Orthwein & Mersman, a grain commission firm, with Joseph J. Mersman. The firm shipped grains to Europe from St. Louis, via New Orleans, Louisiana, and Galveston, Texas. In 1879, Mersman left the business and was replaced by Orthwein's brother William. The firm was renamed Orthwein Brothers and operated until 1893.

In the fall of 1880, Orthwein helped found the St. Louis Mining and Stock Exchange. Orthwein was a member of the St. Louis Merchants Exchange. With Corwin H. Spencer, Orthwein acquired the streetcar system in St. Louis.  He became a multi-millionaire.

Personal life
Orthwein married Caroline Nulsen. They had six sons, Charles C. Orthwein, Max R. Orthwein, Ralph Orthwein, Lee Orthwein, William J. Orthwein, and Armin F. Orthwein, and one daughter, Ruth Orthwein Feuerbacher.

Death
Orthwein died of liver cancer on December 28, 1898. He was buried at the Bellefontaine Cemetery.

References

1839 births
1898 deaths
Businesspeople from St. Louis
German emigrants to the United States
Burials at Bellefontaine Cemetery
19th-century American businesspeople
Orthwein business family